Knights is the plural of knight, a social position originating in the Middle Ages.

Knights may also refer to:

Organisations
Chivalric orders (and their members):
Military orders:
Knights Hospitaller, a medieval Catholic military order, still existing with contemporary branches
Knights of Columbus, a Catholic men's fraternal organization

People
Darryl Knights (born 1988), a professional English footballer
David Knights (born 1945), the original bass guitarist in Procol Harum
Lionel Charles Knights (1906–1997), an English literary critic
Peter Knights (born 1952), a former Australian rules football player and coach

Places
Knights, Missouri
Knights Valley AVA, California wine region in Sonoma County
Left Hand, West Virginia, a community in the United States also known as Knights

Culture
The Knights (orchestra), an orchestra in New York City
The Knights a satirical play by Aristophanes
Knights (film), a 1993 science fiction film directed by Albert Pyun

Sports teams
Knights (cricket team), a South African cricket franchise
Charlotte Knights, a Triple-A baseball team from Charlotte, North Carolina
Franken Knights, an American Football team from Germany
Letran Knights, basketball team of Colegio de San Juan de Letran
London Knights, an Ontario Hockey League team
Newcastle Knights, an Australian rugby league team
New York Knights (rugby league), an American rugby league team
Shreveport Knights, a professional American football team in 1999
UCF Knights, the University of Central Florida sports teams
Vegas Golden Knights, a NHL team in Las Vegas
York City Knights, an English rugby league team

Other
Knights Inn, a hotel chain
Knights of Bahá'u'lláh, a title for Bahá'ís given by Shoghi Effendi
Knights (video game), an arcade game released in 1994
"Knights", a song by Crystal Castles from their self-titled debut album

See also
Knight (disambiguation)